Stadionul Unirea is a multi-purpose stadium in the Jucu de Mijloc village, Jucu commune, Romania. It is currently used mostly for football matches, is the home ground of Speranța Jucu and has a seated capacity of 800 seats.

References

External links
Stadionul Unirea (Jucu) at soccerway.com
Stadionul Unirea (Jucu) at europlan-online.de

Football venues in Romania
Sport in Cluj County
Buildings and structures in Cluj County